Mohamed Tissir (born 1976) is a Moroccan chess player.

Chess career
He won the African Chess Championship in 1999, the Moroccan Chess Championship in 1996, 1999 and 2005, and has represented his country in a number of Chess Olympiads. He has also won a gold medal at the 36th Chess Olympiad of Palma de Mallorca (Spain) in 2004 and also won the Arab games held in Jordan in 1999.

He played in the Chess World Cup 2000, where he finished at the bottom of Group D, and the FIDE World Chess Championship 2004, where he was defeated by Alexey Dreev in the first round.

He is also a chess coach.

References

External links 
 
 Mohamed Tissir chess games at 365Chess.com
 
Mohamed Tissir's profile in lichess.org
Mohamed Tissir's profile in chess.com

1976 births
Living people
Moroccan chess players
Competitors at the 2019 African Games
African Games competitors for Morocco